The AGM-183 ARRW ("Air-Launched Rapid Response Weapon") is a hypersonic air-to-ground missile planned for use by the United States Air Force. Developed by Lockheed Martin, the boost-glide vehicle is propelled to a maximum speed of more than Mach 5 by a rocket motor before gliding toward its target.

History

Development and acquisition
In August 2018, the U.S. Air Force awarded a $480 million contract to Lockheed Martin for the development of an air-launched hypersonic weapon. The resulting missile, the AGM-183A ARRW ("Arrow"), underwent an initial captive carry flight test aboard a U.S. Air Force B-52 in June 2019.

In February 2020, the Trump Administration proposed a 23 percent increase in funding for hypersonic weapons, and the same month, the U.S. Air Force announced it had decided to move forward with acquisition of the AGM-183A.

In March 2020, Under Secretary of Defense for Research and Engineering Michael D. Griffin stated that the United States was "close at hand" to having a hypersonic boost-glide weapon ready to field.

In early 2023, the Congressional Budget Office (CBO) estimated that a production run of 300 ARRWs would have a unit cost of $14.9 million per missile and a program cost of $5.3 billion including platform integration and 20 years of sustainment. For a production run of 100, each copy would cost $18 million with a program cost of $2.2 billion.

Theorized relation to the "Super-Duper Missile"
A "Super-Duper Missile" was announced by US President Donald Trump during a press availability in the Oval Office on May 15, 2020. According to Trump, the Super-Duper Missile is 17 times faster than existing missiles in the United States arsenal; however, Kingston Reif of the Arms Control Association believes the claim may have been a misstatement. PBS news correspondent Nick Schifrin has theorized that the "Super-Duper Missile" is the AGM-183A, as has the China Times.

Design and performance

The weapon uses a boost-glide system, in which it is propelled to hypersonic speed by a rocket on which it is mounted before gliding toward a target. According to Popular Mechanics, the U.S. Air Force was, as of April 2020, considering using the remaining fleet of B-1B bombers as AGM-183A firing platforms, with each aircraft carrying up to 31 of the weapons mounted internally and on external pylons.

Testing 
A booster flight test of ARRW took place in April 2021 at Point Mugu Sea Range, off the coast of Southern California but did not launch successfully; this was the eighth test for ARRW.

Another test in May 2021 for the ARRW's avionics, sensors and communications systems, was successful. The test did not use any of the ARRW’s systems but instead used a B-52 based system.

In July 2021, a second flight test at Point Mugu Sea Range, again being dropped from a B-52 bomber, was a failure as the rocket motor failed to ignite.
On December 15, 2021, the third flight test failed to launch as well. On March 9, 2022, Congress halved funding for ARRW and transferred the balance to ARRW's R&D account to allow for further testing, which puts the procurement contract at risk.

On May 14, 2022, the 419th Flight Test Squadron and the Global Power Bomber Combined Test Force at Edwards Air Force Base conducted the first successful test of the ARRW off the coast of Southern California. The weapon demonstrated separation from the B-52H Stratofortress.

The USAF conducted another successful test of the missile on July 12, 2022.

The USAF completed the first All-Up-Round (AUR) test on December 9, 2022. This test included both the booster and hypersonic glide vehicle. The USAF 412th Test Wing used a B-52H Stratofortress, at Edwards Air Force Base.

See also
 Kh-47M2 Kinzhal
 DF-ZF
 Hypersonic Attack Cruise Missile

References

External links
 Artist's rendering of an AGM-183A in flight

Military research of the United States
Hypersonic aircraft
Nuclear missiles of the United States